Enter 10 Television Private Limited (also known as Enterr10 Television, formerly Enterr10 Television Network) is an Indian mass media company headquartered at Mumbai.

History
The network launched on October 15, 2004. 

In 2009, another channel named Dangal launched as a Bhojpuri entertainment channel. In 2019, it had the highest viewership numbers in its category. 

In 2016, Fakt Marathi launched as a Marathi movie channel that in 2019 changed to general entertainment.   

Bengali entertainment channel Enterr10 Bangla started in 2018. 

The network launched a Kannada entertainment channel Dangal Kannada on September 23, 2020, with Kannada film actress Hariprriya as the brand ambassador and a Bhojpuri entertainment channel, Enterr10 Rangeela

Channels

On air channels

Defunct channels

Enterr10 
Enterr10 is a Hindi/Bhojpuri language 24x7 Entertainment and Movie channel that was owned by Enterr10 Television Network.

Current shows

Former shows

Acquired shows

Original series

Animated shows
Anmol Kahaniyan
Bablu Dablu Cubs
Bablu Dablu Cubs 1
Bablu Dablu Cubs 2
Bablu Dablu Cubs 3
Bablu Dablu Cubs 4
Bablu Dablu Monster Plan
Bablu Dablu Adventure
Bablu Dablu Adventure 2
Bablu Dablu Squad
Gattu The Power Champ
Gattu The Light Guardians
Gattu Dino Diary
Invention Story
Panchtantra Ki Kahaniyan
Pat & Mat
Rochak Kahaniyan
The Jungle Book
Thodi Masti Thodi Shararat
The Beet Party
Yeh Safar Hai Romanch Ka

Reality/Non-scripted programming
Bindaas Hits (2020)

Other assets 
Enterr10 Music Bhojpuri is a film distribution and Music unit.

Controversy 
On October 8, 2020, the owner of Fakt Marathi, Shirish Pattanshetty, was arrested for manipulating television ratings.

References

External links 
 Official Website
 Enterr10 Television Network
Television broadcasting companies of India
Mass media companies based in Mumbai
Indian companies established in 2004
Mass media companies established in 2004
Indian subsidiaries of foreign companies
2004 establishments in Maharashtra